The Sort Merge Generator was an application developed by Betty Holberton in 1951 for the Univac I and is one of the first examples of using a computer to create a computer program. The input to the application was a specification of files and the kind of sort and merge operations to use, and the output would be machine code for performing the specification.

See also
 History of programming languages
 History of computers

References

Notes 

Text-oriented programming languages